Hassell is a multidisciplinary architecture, design and urban planning practice with offices in Australia, China, Singapore, and the United Kingdom. Founded in 1937/8 in Adelaide, South Australia, the firm's former names include Claridge, Hassell and McConnell; Hassell, McConnell and Partners; and Hassell and Partners Pty. Ltd.

They are particularly known for the Adelaide Festival Centre complex, which opened in 1973.

History 
Hassell was founded in Adelaide, South Australia in 1938.

From 1937, Colin Hassell worked with Philip R. Claridge and Associates, with Claridge, Hassell and McConnell being established as a partnership which included Jack McConnell. Hassell served in the Australian Army during the Second World War, resuming his place in the firm in 1945. After Claridge retired in 1949, the firm became Hassell, McConnell and Partners, and established offices in Melbourne and Canberra. In 1962 
John Morphett joined the practice, who was very influenced by the Bauhaus and modernist movements. 
In the 1970s the firm became Hassell and Partners Pty. Ltd., with Hassell as Senior Principal and also Managing Director of the group. During this period, additional offices were opened in Sydney, Melbourne and Perth.

Hassell and Partners Pty Ltd designed the Adelaide Festival Centre in 1970, with the Adelaide Festival Theatre opened in 1973. Said to be designed "from the inside out" by chief designer John Morphett, the complex has been "hailed as a major step forward in modern architecture in South Australia".

After 1978, the firm became simply Hassell.

In 2019, Hassell, then the second-largest design firm in Australia (Woods Bagot, another Adelaide firm, being the largest), announced that they would be closing their Adelaide office upon completion of existing projects in 2021, so it could focus on larger urban centres. The existing projects include the Adelaide GPO development, the Adelaide Festival Centre redevelopments, and the expansion of Adelaide Airport terminal. Although the physical office will be closed, the firm will still be undertaking work in Adelaide, via a consultancy which will be set up by the three principal architects based in Adelaide.

Accolades 
In 2010 the firm was ranked the largest architecture company in Australia and the 25th largest in the world, and retained the Australian ranking for the following two years in the BD World Architecture 100 annual survey.

The firm received Australian Institute of Architects national awards for the Sydney Olympic Park railway station (1998), the VS1/SA Water building in Adelaide (2009), ANZ Centre in Melbourne's Docklands and the railway stations of the Epping to Chatswood railway line (2010).

Selected projects
The firm's first major project was the Art Deco building at 2 King William Street for the Bank of New South Wales.

See also

Architecture of Australia

References

External links

Architecture firms of Australia
Australian companies established in 1938
Design companies established in 1938